The Pearl River Delta Metropolitan Region Intercity Railway System (abbreviated as PRDIR) is a regional higher-speed rail and suburban rail network being gradually constructed in the Pearl River Delta (Yuegang'ao Greater Bay Area), People's Republic of China. The project's goal is to have every major urban center in the Yuegang'ao Greater Bay Area to be within one-hour travel by rail to Guangzhou. On March 16, 2005, the State Council approved plans for a regional high-speed commuter rail network for the Jingjinji, Yangtze River Delta and the Pearl River Delta. In the long term vision network length will reach  by 2030. By then the network will provide basic coverage to the Pearl River Delta region. The Suishen ICR, Guanhui ICR and Guangfozhao ICR accept Alipay, avoiding the need to purchase tickets in advance.

Operational lines 

The system currently has seven lines.

Guangzhu ICR 

The Guangzhou–Zhuhai Intercity Railway or Guangzhu Intercity Railway is a 116 km dedicated, grade-separated passenger railway linking New Guangzhou Station in Panyu, Guangzhou, and Zhuhai Airport in Zhuhai, via Shunde, Zhongshan and Jiangmen. Operation began in 2011.

Guanhui ICR 

The Guanhui Intercity Railway or Guanhui Urban Railway is a 14 station, 100 km long, regional rapid railway line that connects Dongguan to Huizhou. The line was originally planned to use subway type cars with Siemens technology. The line started construction in 2009 and was expected to open in late 2013. Construction was completed in June 2013 and test runs began in 2014, but the first segment of the line, from Xiaojinkou-Changping East did not open until 30 March 2016.

Guangfozhao ICR 

The Guangfozhao Intercity Railway or Fozhao Urban Railway is an 11 station long regional rapid railway line. It connects Guangzhou to Zhaoqing, via Foshan. Operation began on 30 March 2016.

Suishen ICR 

The Guangzhou–Shenzhen Intercity Railway, also known as the Suishen Intercity Railway is a  regional rapid railway line that runs roughly along the east bank of the Pearl River connecting the major cities of Guangzhou, Dongguan, and Shenzhen. Operation began on 15 December 2019.

Zhuji ICR 

The Zhuji Intercity Railway is a high-speed railway connecting Gongbei Subdistrict in Zhuhai with Zhuhai Jinwan Airport via Hengqin. Phase 1 started operation on 18 August 2020.

Guangqing ICR

Guangzhou East Ring intercity railway

Lines under construction

Foguan ICR 

Foshan–Dongguan Intercity Railway, also called the Foguan Intercity Railway, is a planned high-speed railway within Guangdong province, China between the cities of Foshan, via Guangzhou, to Dongguan. It will connect Panyu District, Guangzhou at the major Guangzhou South interchange, tunnelling under the Pearl River through Machong and Hongmei to  providing connections via the Dongguan Rail Transit, the Guangzhou–Shenzhen intercity railway or the Dongguan–Huizhou intercity railway.

Guangfo Circular ICR 

Ring service around Guangzhou, mostly making use of trackage from other Metropolitan Region Intercity Railway Lines and existing freight railways. A new section under construction, known as the Guangfo Link, is a 35 km long railway line that connects Guangzhou South Railway Station to Foshan West Railway Station. It is expected to start construction in late 2012 and completed in 2016 or 2017.

Guangqing ICR 

The Guangqing Intercity Railway is a high-speed railway connecting Guangzhou with Qingyuan.

Approved Lines 
In 2020, with the near completion of the initial batch of lines, the National Development and Reform Commission approved an additional 775 km of intercity railway projects. A number of them will start construction before 2022.

Shenzhen–Dayawan ICR 
A planned underground regional railway connecting Shenzhen and Huiyang District in southern Huizhou from Shenzhen Bao'an International Airport to Shenzhen Pingshan railway station.

Shenhui ICR 
A planned underground regional railway connecting Shenzhen and Huicheng District in northern Huizhou.

See also 
 Shenzhen Metro
 Dongguan Rail Transit
 FMetro (Foshan)
 Guangzhou Metro
 MTR (Hong Kong)
 Macau Light Rail Transit

Notes

References 

Pearl River Delta
Rapid transit in China
Transport in Guangdong